The 2004 Czech Indoor Open Open was a men's tennis tournament played on indoor hard courts in Průhonice, Czech Republic, and was part of the 2004 ATP Challenger Series.

This was the second edition of the event and was held from 23 to 28 November 2004.

The defending champion Mario Ančić didn't enlist into this edition.

Tuomas Ketola, at his first participation in the tournament, won in the final 1–6, 6–4, 6–3, against Lukáš Dlouhý.

Seeds

Draw

Finals

Top half

Bottom half

References
Qualifying Draw

Main Draw

Draws on ITF Site

2004 Singles